Susan Elizabeth Hough (born March 20, 1961) is a seismologist at the United States Geological Survey in Pasadena, California, and scientist in charge of the office. She has served as an editor and contributor for many journals and is a contributing editor to Geotimes Magazine. She is the author of five books, including Earthshaking Science (Princeton).

Biography
Hough graduated from the University of California, Berkeley in 1982 and is a University of California, San Diego Alumna, earning her Ph.D. in geophysics from the Scripps Institution of Oceanography in 1987.

She has served on the board of directors of the Seismological Society of America from 1998 to 2004 and of the Southern California Earthquake Center from 2006 to 2009.

Subsequent to the 2010 Haiti earthquake, Hough led the United States Geological Survey team charged with the installation of seismic stations and accelerometers. The USGS are contributing to earthquake engineering efforts by improving earthquake monitoring and reporting by means of their USGS Advanced National Seismic System (ANSS). Hough and her team deployed portable seismometers for recording aftershocks of the earthquake, and she continues to cooperate with Haitian seismologosists for setting up permanent seismic monitoring in their country. Areas at risk in future earthquakes are mapped by means of seismic microzonation using local geological conditions to characterize seismic hazard. Normally, the effect of sedimentary layers are considered, however local topography is not considered in this context. However, the results provided by Hough and her team highlighted that topographic amplification played a major role in causing the earthquake damage in Pétion-Ville, a suburb of Port-au-Prince, thereby challenging the conventional view on factors to consider when performing microzonation.

Hough has written numerous articles for mainstream publications such as the Los Angeles Times. Altogether she has published over 100 articles in peer-reviewed journals.

Publications
Books
 Predicting the Unpredictable: The Tumultuous Science of Earthquake Prediction (2009), Princeton University Press, 
 Richter's Scale: Measure of an Earthquake, Measure of a Man, a biography of famed seismologist Charles Richter (2007), Princeton University Press, 
 After the Earth Quakes: Elastic Rebound on an Urban Planet (2005), Oxford University Press, 
 Finding Fault in California: An Earthquake Tourist's Guide (2004), Mountain Press Publishing Company, 
 Earthshaking Science: What We Know (and Don't Know) about Earthquakes (2004), Princeton University Press, 
The Great Quake Debate: The Crusader, the Skeptic, and the Rise of Modern Seismology (2020), University of Washington Press, ISBN 9780295747361

Articles (selection)
 Susan E. Hough, Alan Yong, Jean Robert Altidor, Dieuseul Anglade, Doug Given, Saint-Louis Mildor: Site Characterization and Site Response in Port-au-Prince, Haiti, Earthquake Spectra, Volume 27, Issue S1 (October 2011) 
 Susan Hough: Five myths about earthquakes, Washington Post, 26 August 2011
 S. Hough, J. Altidor, D. Anglade, D. Given: Localized damage caused by topographic amplification during the 2010 M7.0 Haiti earthquake, Nature Geoscience, 2010
 Susan E. Hough: Haiti is a reminder of how we can help other quake-prone areas, Los Angeles Times, February 8, 2010
 Susan Hough: Confusing Patterns with Coincidences, New York Times, 11 April 2009

References

External links
 USGS profile of Susan Hough

American seismologists
American biographers
American science writers
1961 births
Living people
American women geologists
Scientists from California
United States Geological Survey personnel
University of California, Berkeley alumni
20th-century American geologists
21st-century American geologists
20th-century American women scientists
21st-century American women scientists
20th-century American women writers
20th-century American non-fiction writers
21st-century American women writers
Women geophysicists
American geophysicists
21st-century American non-fiction writers
American women biographers